The MSG Prime Minister's Cup, formerly known as Melanesia Cup  is an association football championship played between the Melanesian countries, it was used (along with the Polynesia Cup) for qualification to the Oceania Nations Cup. The original tournament used a round-robin format involving every team playing each other once at the tournaments location.

In 2008, the Wantok Cup was established as a competition between Papua New Guinea, the Solomon Islands and Vanuatu. It was described by the Oceania Football Confederation as "a tournament reminiscent of the now defunct Melanesian Cup".

In 2022 the tournament was revived under the current name, the MSG Prime Minister's Cup and the 2022 edition will be hosted in Vanuatu and contested by all the five FIFA melanesian members.

Participants

Total wins

Results

Source: https://www.rsssf.org/tablesm/melanesiacup.html

See also
 Melanesian Super Cup
 Polynesia Cup
 Wantok Cup

References

 
Defunct international association football competitions in Oceania
OFC Nations Cup qualification
Recurring sporting events disestablished in 2000
Recurring sporting events established in 1988